Greatest Hits is the first collection of Maureen McGovern's previously recorded material.  The album is a re-package of McGovern's 1979 self-titled album with the song order re-arranged and with the substitution of "The Morning After" in place of "Life's A Long Way Down." The album cover uses the picture from the front cover of the 1979 self-titled album. The album omits two of her best received movie theme songs, "We May Never Love Like This Again" and "We Could Have It All" as well as other Adult Contemporary hits from McGovern's first three albums.

Track listing

Album credits
Tracks 2-10 produced by: Michael Lloyd
Executive producer: Mike Curb
Art direction/design: Neuman, Walker & Associates
Album coordination: Marguerite Luciani

1990 compilation albums
Maureen McGovern compilation albums
Curb Records compilation albums